Ngāti Apa is a Māori iwi (tribe) in Rangitikei District of New Zealand. Its rohe (traditional tribal lands) extend between the Mangawhero, Whangaehu, Turakina and Rangitīkei rivers. This area is bounded by Whanganui River in the north-west, and Manawatū River in the south-east. The marae in this district include Tini wai tara, Whangaehu, Kauangaroa, and Parewanui.

History

Ngāti Apa take their name from the ancestor Apa-hāpai-taketake, who was the son of Ruatea. Stories of Apa's deeds place the tribe's origins in the Bay of Plenty. To the west of Pūtauaki mountain is a place known to Māori as Te Takanga-a-Apa (the place where Apa fell), so named because, according to one account, it was where Apa was kicked to the ground by the pet moa of a man called Te Awatope. Because he limped after this incident, he was named Apa-koki (Apa with a limp). One explanation for the place name is that Apa fell to his death there. Another account says he was banished from the district after slaughtering Te Awatope's moa.

Ngati Apa then found themselves living in the Rotoaira lake district. Apa started sending parts of his tribe south to cultivate the land and have settlements ready before the whole party travelled down. However Apa did not leave until after he had eaten one of Te Awatope's favourite dogs. Te Awatope sought to kill Apa as this dog was his favourite. However, when he went to where Ngati Apa had settled he was told by some people that Apa had been warned the previous evening and had already proceeded south during the night. Many generations later, Ngati Apa were not only descended from Apa Hapaitaketake, but also of Turi captain of Aotea Paerangi normally associated to the Āti Hau and Ngāti Rangi tribes. Some along the Rangitikei River (Papawhenua's descendants) were not only of Kurahaupō, but also of Matahourua.

Many Ngati Apa deny any connection to the Bay Of Plenty, Putauaki area.

Today Ngāti apa have many Hapū, named here are the ones still active to this day.
Turakina
Ngā Āriki. Ngāti Kiriwheke and Ngāti Rātua
Whangaehu
Ngāti Hikapirau, Ngāti Rangiwaho, Ngāti Rangiwhakaturia and Ngāti Rangipakini

The New Zealand foreshore and seabed controversy was sparked when, on 19 June 2003, New Zealand's Court of Appeal ruled, in the Ngāti Apa decision, that Māori were entitled to seek "customary title" over areas of New Zealand's foreshore and seabed in the Māori Land Court.

References

External links
 Ngāti Apa in Te Ara - the Encyclopedia of New Zealand 
 Te Rūnanga o Ngāti Apa